Anomoia is a genus of tephritid  or fruit flies in the family Tephritidae. The name is frequently misspelled as Anomoea, though the latter is a beetle genus.

References

Trypetinae
Articles containing video clips
Tephritidae genera
Taxa named by Francis Walker (entomologist)